Vonda Shepard (born July 7, 1963) is an American singer, songwriter, music director, and actress. She is perhaps best known for her starring role as a fictionalized version of herself on the television series Ally McBeal (1997–2002), for which she recorded five soundtrack albums as well as the series' theme song "Searchin' My Soul", which saw international commercial success. Shepard has otherwise released nine studio albums and three live albums. She received a Screen Actors Guild Award as a cast member of Ally McBeal in 1999 among two additional nominations, and received a Billboard award for selling the most television soundtrack albums in history.

Life and career
Vonda Shepard was born in New York City in 1963. Her family relocated to California when she was a child, and she played piano from an early age. Her father was Richmond Shepard, a mime and improvisational actor. She has three sisters. After performing as a backup singer, Shepard received her own recording contract and made her first chart appearance in 1987 with her duet with Dan Hill, "Can't We Try." Her self-titled debut studio album followed in 1989. It saw the moderate commercial success of the single "Don't Cry Ilene", which peaked at number 17 on the Billboard Hot Adult Contemporary chart and remained there for 12 weeks.

While promoting her third studio album It's Good, Eve (1996), Shepard performed at the Key Club in Hollywood, California, where she invited Michelle Pfeiffer and her husband David E. Kelley. Kelley decided during the performance that he wanted Shepard to record the soundtrack for his forthcoming television series Ally McBeal, having been looking for a singer to be the voice and inner thoughts of the character. Her biggest commercial success while starring on the series was the theme song "Searchin' My Soul", an original selection that originally appeared on her second studio album The Radical Light (1992), jointly written and composed by Shepard and Paul Howard Gordon. Her version of Kay Starr's Christmas classic "(Everybody's Waitin' for) The Man with the Bag", after it was featured on a season 4 episode of Ally McBeal, became a popular holiday song. 

Shepard went on to record four soundtrack albums and one compilation album for Ally McBeal. She has otherwise released nine solo studio albums and three live albums to date. She married music producer Mitchell Froom in 2004; they had their first child in 2006. In 2010, she provided vocals for "I Need You," whose music had been composed by James Newton Howard, for the film Love & Other Drugs.

Discography

Albums

Studio albums

Soundtrack albums

Live albums

Singles

References

External links

 
 
 Vonda Shepard at Richard De La Font Agency

1963 births
Living people
American contraltos
American women singer-songwriters
American women pop singers
American television actresses
Singer-songwriters from California
Singers from New York City
Reprise Records artists
550 Music artists
Singer-songwriters from New York (state)
21st-century American women